The Anglican Diocese of Kwara is one of eight within the Anglican Province of Kwara, itself one of 14 provinces within the Church of Nigeria. The current bishop, appointed in 2017, is Olusegun Adeyemi, who is also Archbishop of the Province.

Notes

Church of Nigeria dioceses
Dioceses of the Province of Kwara